Arthur Barraclough (7 November 1916 – 2005) was an English professional footballer who played in the Football League for Swindon Town as an outside left.

Career statistics

References

English footballers
English Football League players

1916 births
2005 deaths
Footballers from West Yorkshire
Association football outside forwards
Peterborough United F.C. players
Midland Football League players
Chelsea F.C. players
Swindon Town F.C. players
Clapton Orient F.C. wartime guest players
Notts County F.C. wartime guest players
Doncaster Rovers F.C. wartime guest players